David Albert Charles Armstrong-Jones, 2nd Earl of Snowdon (born 3 November 1961), styled as Viscount Linley until 2017 and known professionally as David Linley, is an English furniture maker, honorary chairman of the auction house Christie's UK, and with his sister, Lady Sarah Chatto, maternal first cousin of King Charles III. He is the only son of Princess Margaret and Antony Armstrong-Jones, 1st Earl of Snowdon, and a grandson of King George VI.

Early life and education
David Albert Charles Armstrong-Jones was born on 3 November 1961, in Clarence House, London, the son of Princess Margaret and Antony Armstrong-Jones, 1st Earl of Snowdon. He was baptised on 19 December 1961 in the Music Room at Buckingham Palace. His godparents were his aunt Queen Elizabeth II, Lady Elizabeth Cavendish, Patrick Plunket, 7th Baron Plunket, Lord Rupert Nevill, and Simon Phipps.

At the age of five, Snowdon began lessons in the Buckingham Palace schoolroom with his cousin Prince Andrew. He went to several independent schools: first, to Gibbs Pre-Preparatory School in Kensington in London, now known as Collingham College. Followed by the pre-preparatory section of Ashdown House School, East Sussex, then on to Millbrook House School, near Abingdon, in Oxfordshire, and finally to Bedales School,  where he developed a passion for arts and crafts. From 1980 to 1982 he studied at Parnham House in the small town of Beaminster in Dorset, for craftsmen in wood.

Snowdon has one full sister, Lady Sarah Chatto (née Armstrong-Jones), and two paternal half-sisters, Lady Frances von Hofmannsthal (née Armstrong-Jones) and Polly Fry. Snowdon also has a half-brother, Jasper Cable-Alexander, son of his father and Melanie Cable-Alexander, an editor at Country Life magazine.

Professional life 

Snowdon opened a workshop in Dorking, where he designed and made furniture for three years before setting up his own company, David Linley Furniture Limited (now known as Linley), where he makes bespoke furniture, upholstery, and interior design products known for their neoclassical appearance and use of inlaid woods. He has written numerous books and lectured around the world. His work is sold in retail stores in Belgravia, Harrods, and overseas, including the Bespoke Collection. He borrowed from his company by causing it to make loans, acquiring some £3 million in debts, a situation eventually resolved by the sale of controlling shares for £4 million in 2012; he thereby lost control of the company.

On 1 December 2006, Snowdon took up the post of chairman of Christie's UK, having joined the board in 2005 as a non-executive director. In 2015, his position was changed to honorary chairman of Christie's EMERI (Europe, Middle East, Russia, and India).

In the past Snowdon dabbled in the restaurant business with his friend and second cousin Patrick Lichfield; they established a restaurant called Deals in Chelsea, London. According to Princess Margaret's biographer, Theo Aronson, Snowdon had a flair for the networking aspect of business and was successful in getting people to come through the doors.

Candidacy for the House of Lords 
Snowdon's father was originally a member of the House of Lords by virtue of his being granted a peerage. When the House of Lords was reformed in 1999 and most hereditary peers lost their seats, he was given a life peerage. An offer of a life peerage was made to all hereditary peers of the first creation (those for whom a peerage was originally created, as opposed to those who inherited a peerage from an ancestor) at that time. The second earl, accordingly, did not inherit a place in the House of Lords along with his title. 

However, in 2018 Snowdon became a candidate in a by-election to fill a vacancy among the ranks of the crossbench peers. Only hereditary peers are eligible to stand in this election, and only the 31 currently sitting in the Lords as crossbenchers are eligible to vote. Unlike other candidates, Snowdon did not write a statement accompanying his announcement of candidacy. He later withdrew from consideration for the seat. Reportedly, his candidacy had "raised eyebrows" due to his relation to the royal family.

Personal life and family 
 
In 1990, Snowdon took legal action against the Today newspaper for an article accusing him of "rowdy behaviour in a pub". He was eventually awarded £30,000 damages.

On 8 October 1993, Snowdon married the Hon. Serena Alleyne Stanhope (born 1 March 1970, Limerick, Ireland), daughter of Viscount Petersham (later the 12th Earl of Harrington) at St. Margaret's Church, Westminster. There were 650 guests in attendance. Through her father, Stanhope descends from Henry FitzRoy, 1st Duke of Grafton, one of the illegitimate children of Charles II of England.

Snowdon and his wife have two children:
 Charles Patrick Inigo Armstrong-Jones, Viscount Linley (born 1 July 1999 at Portland Hospital in London), an Old Etonian who studied product design engineering at Loughborough University 
 Lady Margarita Elizabeth Rose Alleyne Armstrong-Jones (born 14 May 2002 at Portland Hospital in London), a former student at St Mary's, Ascot and Tudor Hall School, Banbury, who is currently studying at Oxford Brookes University.

From 2000 until 2002, Snowdon, his wife and son lived at Kensington Palace with his mother, Princess Margaret, in her declining years. On 8 April 2002, Snowdon, along with the Prince of Wales, the Duke of York, and the Earl of Wessex, "stood guard" at the lying-in-state of their grandmother, Queen Elizabeth The Queen Mother. This Vigil of the Princes had taken place only once before, during the lying-in-state of George V in 1936.

In October and November 2007, rumours circulated on the internet suggesting that a member of the British royal family was the victim of blackmail. The first confirmation that the royal in the extortion attempt was indeed Viscount Linley, as Snowdon was known at the time, came from the journalist Nicholas Davies. Ian Strachan and Sean McGuigan tried to extort £50,000 from Snowdon in September by threatening to release video footage showing sex acts and cocaine use (allegedly by Snowdon and a male royal aide) on a mobile phone. Snowdon contacted the police. Strachan and McGuigan were arrested after showing their video footage to an undercover detective, and at trial were sentenced to five years in prison.

In 2011, Snowdon's daughter, Margarita Armstrong-Jones, was a bridesmaid at the wedding of Prince William and Catherine Middleton. In 2012, Snowdon's son, styled by courtesy as Viscount Linley since January 2017, was appointed by the Queen as a page of honour. 
The Snowdons have three homes: a flat in Chelsea, London; a cottage on the Daylesford estate in Gloucestershire; and the Chateau d'Autet in the Luberon, Provence.

The Earl and his wife separated in February 2020, and a spokesperson confirmed they are to obtain a divorce.

Titles, styles, honours and arms

Titles and styles
3 November 1961 – 13 January 2017: Viscount Linley
13 January 2017 – present: The Right Honourable The Earl of Snowdon

Honours
 6 February 1977: Queen Elizabeth II Silver Jubilee Medal
 6 February 2002: Queen Elizabeth II Golden Jubilee Medal
 6 February 2012: Queen Elizabeth II Diamond Jubilee Medal
 6 February 2022: Queen Elizabeth II Platinum Jubilee Medal

Arms

Published works 
 Linley, David. Classical Furniture. Harry N. Abrams, 1993. .
 Linley, David. Extraordinary Furniture. Harry N. Abrams, 1996. .
 Linley, David. Design and Detail in the Home. Harry N. Abrams, 2000. .
 Linley, David; Charles Cator and Helen Chislett. The Enduring Beauty of Spectacular Furniture. The Monacelli Press, 2009. .
 Miller, Judith. Foreword by David Linley. World Styles from Classical to Contemporary. Dorling Kindersley, 2005. .
 Niagara Foundation. Introductions by Viscount Linley, Julian Smith, and Peter Strokes. Early Architecture of the Town and Township of Niagara. Dundurn Press, 2015. .
 Reginato, James. Foreword by Viscount Linley. Great Houses, Modern Aristocrats. Rizzoli, 2016. .

References

External links 

 Linley website
 Linley-designed suites at the Hotel Baltschug Kempinski Moscow
 Linley-designed suites at Claridge's
 David Albert Charles Armstrong-Jones, Viscount Linley (1961–), Son of Princess Margaret Rose and 1st Earl of Snowdon (National Portrait Gallery photographs)

1961 births
Living people
David 
British cabinetmakers
Christie's people 
Earls of Snowdon
English businesspeople 
English furniture designers
English people of German-Jewish descent 
People educated at Ashdown House
People educated at Bedales School
People educated at Gibbs School 
People from Westminster
Princess Margaret, Countess of Snowdon
Sons of life peers